Quem (also called Quem Acontece) is a magazine published in Brazil by Editora Globo, a magazine focusing on subjects about celebrities in evidence from the national and even international scene.

The magazine was published in print until July 2017, when Editora Globo announced its end. The last print edition was 878, published on June 28, 2017. From that date, Quem started to focus on its online portal, publishing weekly interviews with entertainment personalities. With the creation of the Globo + app, which brings together all Infoglobo publications, Quem has been published again in magazine format.

References

Magazines published in Brazil
Weekly magazines published in Brazil
Globo magazines
News magazines published in South America
Portuguese-language magazines
Online magazines with defunct print editions